The 2022 FIS Nordic Junior World Ski Championships were held from 22 February to 6 March 2022 in Zakopane, Poland and Lygna, Norway.

Schedule
All times are local (UTC+1).

Cross-country

Nordic combined

Ski jumping

Medal summary

Junior events

Cross-country skiing

Nordic combined

Ski jumping

U23 events

Cross-country skiing

Medal tables

All events

Junior events

Under-23 events

References

2022
Junior World
Junior World
Junior World
2022 in Polish sport
2022 in Norwegian sport
2022 in youth sport
International sports competitions hosted by Poland
International sports competitions hosted by Norway
Sports competitions in Zakopane
February 2022 sports events in Norway
March 2022 sports events in Poland